is a character franchise created in collaboration by Sanrio and Sega Sammy Holdings, illustrated by character designer Ai Setani (Kirimichan). It is the second Sanrio franchise that was handled by two companies, the first being Jewelpet. The franchise was officially launched in December 2015.

An anime adaptation produced by Studio DEEN, titled "Rilu Rilu Fairilu ~Yousei no Door~", aired on all TXN stations in Japan from February 6, 2016 to March 25, 2017. A second season titled "Rilu Rilu Fairilu ~Mahou no Kagami~" began airing from April 7, 2017 to March 30, 2018. A 3rd season titled "Oshiete Mahou no Pendulum ~Rilu Rilu Fairilu~" began its airing from July 7, 2018 to January 5, 2019.

Story

In a strange bubbly, and magical world of Little Fairilu live the Fairilus: small magical fairies representing flowers, insects and other entities who are all born from the Fairilu Seed. Each Fairilu is born with its own key, the Fairilu Key, that can open magical doors, casting magic spells. If the Fairilu finds the right door, it can finally mature into a full-fledged fairy. The doors also link to the human world. Fairilus must study and go to school to learn about the world in which they live, while meeting new friends.

1st & 2nd Series
The anime series focuses on Lip, a newly-born Flower Fairilu, and her friends in Little Fairlu. The series follows Lip's overall life in Little Fairilu while making new friends and learning from everything around her, growing up day after day. It also tells about the Fairilu friends' adventures in the human world, where they can meet their human partners who support their dreams and are willing to help each other fulfill them.

3rd Series
The anime tells about a human girl called Arisu Hanazono, who by chance discovered a magical pendulum and book, summoning Fairilus. She is a girl with many worries, but by meeting the friendly Fairilus and traveling into their homeworld, Little Fairilu, she gets a chance to solve her problems and change herself.

Characters

Flower Fairilu

A pink tulip Fairilu. She cries easily, but has a kind heart and does not give up. When she was about to be born from her Fairilu Seed, she couldn't open the Door of Birth but was encouraged by Nozomu. She then eventually born into the world. From then on, she always think of him. 
In season 3, she acts like Spica's younger sister. She is also in love with Drop (Nozomu's Fairilu form, but not the same person from season 1 & 2).

A sunflower Fairilu. She is simple and innocent, yet cheerful, bright and full of energy. She loves the sun. She is good at dancing and is popular with everyone.

A violet Fairilu. She is good at painting and likes beautiful things that bring a little happiness. She is extremely sensitive. Her dream is to be a fashion designer.

A red rose Fairilu. She is prideful, yet sometimes can be a bit clumsy. She is a hard-worker. At first she saw Lip as her rival and tended to be alone, but with Lip's effort, she gradually gets along with others.
In season 3, she is good at hair styling and cosmetic blending. She is also in love with Juli (Yuuto's Fairilu form, but not the same person from season 1 & 2).

A gentian Fairilu. She is carefree and is always sleepy. She was born one year later than the other Fairilus of Lip's generation. Her Fairilu Seed was accidentally sent to the human world and was picked up and kept by Karen. She, as an unborn Fairilu, constantly encouraged Karen, who was in a hospital. She finally was born into the world with Karen's encouragement, and becomes friends with Lip and others.
In season 3, she likes making perfumes, hoping to create perfumes that can support others' feelings.
	

An olive Fairilu.
	

A dandelion Fairilu.
 and 

A pair of lily of the valley Fairilu twins.
	

A lavender hydrangea Fairilu.
	

A cherry blossom Fairilu.
	

A red spider lily Fairilu.
	

A baby's breath Fairilu.
	

A thistle Fairilu.
	

A pink dahlia Fairilu.
	

A jasmine Fairilu.
	

A yellow gerbera Fairilu.
	
A marguerite Fairilu.

Mermaid Fairilu

	
A mermaid Fairilu, with her name comes from the Akoya pearl.
	

A mermaid Fairilu, with her name comes from coral.
	
	
A mermaid Fairilu, with her name comes from seaweed.
	
	
A mermaid Fairilu, with his name comes from fish.
	

A mermaid Fairilu.
	
	
A mermaid Fairilu.
	
	
A mermaid Fairilu.
	

A mermaid Fairilu.

Bugs Fairilu

A rhinoceros beetle Fairilu.	
	

A stag beetle Fairilu.
	

An autumn darter Fairilu.
	
	
A honeybee Fairilu.
	
	
A firefly Fairilu.
	
	
A small cabbage white Fairilu.
	

A mantis Fairilu.
	

A spider Fairilu.
	

A ladybug Fairilu.
	

A pale grass blue Fairilu.
	

A cockroach Fairilu.
	

A cockroach Fairilu.
	

A cockroach Fairilu.
	

A cockroach Fairilu.
	

A swallowtail butterfly Fairilu.
	

A large brown cicada Fairilu.
	

A katydid Fairilu.
	

A jewel beetle Fairilu.
	

A silkmoth Fairilu.

Mushroom Fairilu
	

A mushroom Fairilu.
	

A mushroom Fairilu.
	

A mushroom Fairilu.
	

A fly agaric Fairilu.
	

A Mycena chlorophos Fairilu.
	

A poisonous mushroom Fairilu, with his name comes from hypha.
	

A poisonous mushroom Fairilu, with his name comes from spore.
	

A butterscotch mushroom Fairilu.

Veggie Fairilu
	

A carrot Fairilu.
	

A tomato Fairilu.
	

An artichoke Fairilu.
	

A baby corn Fairilu.
	

A cabbage Fairilu.
	

A green peas Fairilu.
	

An Irish Cobbler Fairilu.
	

An onion Fairilu.
	

A broccoli Fairilu.
	

A cauliflower Fairilu.
	

A celery Fairilu.

Weather Fairilu
	

A sun Fairilu.
	

A rain Fairilu.
	

A thunder Fairilu.
	

An aurora Fairilu.
	

A cloud Fairilu.
	

A rainbow Fairilu.
	

A star Fairilu.
	

A snow Fairilu.
	

A dense fog Fairilu.
	

A wind Fairilu.

Ikemenjo Fairilu
Called the "Beautiful Fairilu" in the Hong Kong version.
	

A titan arum Fairilu.
	
	
A rafflesia Fairilu.
	
	
A venus flytrap Fairilu.
	
	
A sensative plant Fairilu.

A cactus Fairilu.
	
	
A pitcher plant Fairilu.

A durian Fairilu.

Twinkle Fairilu
	
	
A Spica star Fairilu.
In season 3, she became one of the main characters. She acts like Lip's elder sister.

A Vega star Fairilu.
	
	
A Sirius star Fairilu.

A Procyon star Fairilu.

Fruits Fairilu

An apple Fairilu.

A peach Fairilu.

A lemon Fairilu.

A blueberry Fairilu.

A strawberry Fairilu.

A pineapple Fairilu.

A pomegranate Fairilu.

An oroblanco Fairilu.
 and 

A pair of cherry Fairilu twins.

Legend Fairilu

	
Overseer of all Fairilus. Originally named Ren, he is a water lily Fairilu. 
In season 3, he appears in his child form as Ren and is Lip and co.'s friend.
	
	
Headmistress of Saint Fairilu School. Originally named Sonia, she is a sandersonia Fairilu. 
 and 	

A pair of unicorn Fairilu twins.	
	

A Powa-Powa Dog. He is Lip's pet.
	

A Powa-Powa Dog. She is Rose's pet.

A pinecone Fairilu.

A pinecone Fairilu. She is Bokkuri's wife.

A goldfish Fairilu.

A chameleon Fairilu.

A British Shorthair Fairilu.

Humans

1st & 2nd Series
	
	
The main human protagonist of season 1, he is a kind and gentle 12-year-old (13 in season 2) middle school student who is searching for the Fairilu's existence after his grandmother gave him a picture book about them. Apart from the first episode, he has never had any direct contact with them until episode 55, when he finally meets Lip again.
In season 3, he appears as a Fairilu named Drop. Like his human self, he is in love with Lip.

Nozomu's younger sister, she debuts in and is the main human protagonist of season 2. She was in a hospital of a foreign country when she discovered Rin's Fairilu Seed, which seemed to give her encouragement, and she cherished it. Later in Little Fairilu, where Rin's seed was brought back in order to let her be born into the world, she encouraged Rin to open the Door of Birth and finally, Rin succeeded.

3rd Series

The main human protagonist of season 3, she is a middle school student who is always worried. Being a transfer student and not good at talking with others, she cannot make friends easily. One day she discovered Magical Pendulum and a magic book in a grocery store, which made her meet Lip and Spica and went to Little Fairilu with them.

Media

Merchandise
The franchise was first announced in Press Conference on December 11, 2015 as the second collaboration work between Sanrio and Sega Sammy Holdings, meant for the younger female demographic. It was revealed also that the series will have themes relating to flowers and keys, as well as mermaids and insects with characters officially based on the said themes. Merchandise of the series is officially planned, including stationary, toys, raincoats, clothing and more and was released in March 2016. In games, the series will appear in the next installment of the Apron of Magic Arcade game. More information of the franchise was unveiled on the 2016 Sanrio Expo on January 30, 2016, which includes the Sanrio Puroland Mascot form of Lip as well as revealed merchandise.

Anime
An anime adaptation of the series, titled  is officially animated by Studio DEEN and began airing in all TXN stations in Japan on February 6, 2016, replacing Jewelpet Magical Change: Dream Selection on its initial timeslot, and ended on March 25, 2017. It is directed by Sakura Gojō and written by Aya Matsui (Boys Over Flowers, Marmalade Boy, Tamagotchi!). The anime's opening theme is titled Brand New Days by Korean Pop group Apink as their 5th Japanese Single. The first ending theme is titled key of life by Shiggy Jr, the second is titled  by Kera Kera, and the third is titled  by Yumiri Hanamori, Rina Hidaka, Aya Uchida and Aina Kusuda as Lip, Sumire, Himawari and Rose.

A sequel, titled  was announced by Sanrio via the official Anime Twitter account, began airing on April 7, 2017, and ended on March 30, 2018. It is directed by Sakura Gojō and Nana Imanaka, written by Akemi Omode. The first opening theme of this series is titled  by Girl group Apink as their 7th Japanese Single together with their song "Bye Bye", and the second is titled  by Silent Siren. The first ending theme is titled  by Q-pitch, and the second is titled  by the same group.

A third season, titled  began its airing on Kids Station, Animax and Tokyo MX, and the premiere dates are July 7, July 8 and July 15, 2018 respectively. It ended on January 5, 2019 for the earliest. It is directed by Chisei Maeda and written by Akemi Omode. The anime's opening theme is titled  by Yumiri Hanamori and Ari Ozawa as Lip and Spica. The ending theme is titled  by Yumiri Hanamori as Lip.

Episode List

1st Series

2nd Series

3rd Series

References

External links
 Sega's Official Website
 Sanrio's Official Website
 Official Anime Website of Rilu Rilu Fairilu ~Yousei no Door~
 Official Anime Website of Rilu Rilu Fairilu ~Mahou no Kagami~

2016 anime television series debuts
2017 anime television series debuts
2018 anime television series debuts
Japanese children's animated fantasy television series
Television about fairies and sprites
Studio Deen
TV Tokyo original programming
Sanrio
Sega franchises
Shōnen manga
Sanrio characters
2010s toys
Joint ventures
Fictional fairies and sprites
Mass media franchises introduced in 2016
Sega_characters
Mermaids in television
Magical girl anime and manga